Campomanesia speciosa is a species of plant in the family Myrtaceae. It is endemic to the Amazon basin in eastern Peru and Acre (state) of Brazil. It is threatened by habitat loss.

References

speciosa
Flora of the Amazon
Trees of Brazil
Trees of Peru
Near threatened flora of South America
Taxonomy articles created by Polbot